The Master of the Sterbini Diptych was an Italian painter active most likely in Venice during the early fourteenth century; other locations along the Adriatic coast have also been suggested.  Several panels associated with this artist are believed to exist; his name is derived from a painting now in the Museo del Palazzo Venezia in Rome.  Little is known about the artist, save that he works in the Italo-Byzantine style, influenced by the Cretan school or Greek traditions of icon-painting.  Some historians believe that the artist may actually be a workshop group.

References
Morello, Giovanni and Laurence B. Kanter, ed.: The Treasury of Saint Francis of Assisi.  Milan; Electa, 1999.

14th-century Italian painters
Sterbini Diptych, Master of the
Painters from Venice